Newlands Cricket Ground in Cape Town, South Africa was established in 1888 and has hosted international cricket since 1889. The ground's first Test match was played between a South African representative XI and an English side touring South Africa. This match was given retrospective Test match status in 1897. The first One Day International (ODI) played on the ground took place in 1992 following the reintegration of South Africa to international cricket after the sporting boycott of South Africa during the apartheid era. The first Twenty20 International (T20I) on the ground was played in 2007. Two women's Test matches were played on the ground, one in 1962 and one in 1970, and women's ODI and T20I matches have been played at Newlands since 2009.

In cricket, a five-wicket haul (also known as a "five-for" or "fifer") refers to a bowler taking five or more wickets in a single innings. This is regarded as a notable achievement. This article details the five-wicket hauls taken on the ground in official international Test matches, One Day Internationals and Twenty20 Internationals.

Three five-wicket hauls were taken in the ground's first Test match in 1889, South African Gobo Ashley taking seven wickets for the cost of 95 runs (7/95) in the first innings of the match. England bowler Johnny Briggs took 7/17 and 8/11 in the South African side's two innings as the hosts were bowled out for 47 and 43 runs when they batted. Briggs' bowling figures are the best on the ground in Test matches, with match figures of 15/28. In women's Test cricket, both five-wicket hauls on the ground were taken by Lorna Ward, the first in the 1960 match.

South Africa's Hansie Cronje took the first five-wicket haul on the ground in a One Day International, taking 5/32 against India in 1992. This was the first One Day International played in South Africa. Zimbabwe's Henry Olonga recorded the best ODI bowling figures with 6/19 against England in 2000. The only five-wicket haul taken in a Twenty20 International on the ground was taken by West Indian Anisa Mohammed in a women's T20I in 2009.

Key

Test match five-wicket hauls

A total of 73 five-wicket hauls have been taken in Test matches on the ground, including two in women's Tests.

Men's matches

Women's matches

One Day International five-wicket hauls

A total of eight five-wicket hauls have been taken in ODIs on the ground, all in men's matches.

Twenty20 International five-wicket hauls

A single five-wicket haul has been taken in T20 International matches at Newlands. West Indies bowler Anisa Mohammed took five wickets against South Africa in a women's T20I in 2009.

Notes

References

External links
International five-wicket hauls at Newlands, CricInfo

Newlands Cricket Ground
Newlands Cricket Ground